Stepa is a given name.

Stepa may refer to:

Persons
Dariusz "Stepa" Stepnowski, former member of Polish punk band Dezerter, known as Stepa
Stepa Stepanović (1856–1929), vojvoda of the Serbian Army
Tatiana Stepa (1963–2009), Romanian folk singer
Stepa Zivkovic (2002) Italian author
Joni Stenberg (1987–), artist name Stepa, Finnish rapper

Places
Vojvoda Stepa, village in Serbia

Music
Stepa, Finnish rap artist
Stepa, American nu metal band

See also
Stepas Butautas (1925–2001), Lithuanian basketball player who competed for the Soviet Union in the 1952 Summer Olympics

Steppe, Ecoregion of plain grasslands without trees